On 5 May 1945, the concentration camp in German-occupied Holýšov was liberated by the Polish Holy Cross Mountains Brigade. Around 700 women were freed, as well as 200 SS members and 15 guards were imprisoned.

Background
The Holy Cross Mountains Brigade, established 11 August 1944, was one of the largest formations in the National Armed Forces. In January of 1945, the Brigade, in fear of being crushed by the Red Army, decided to start marching west. They set up a camp near Holýšov on 1 May 1945 and after contacting the local Czech rebels, they were informed of the concentration camp nearby.

Liberation 
In the evening of 4 May, the brigade met with Czech resistance leaders to plan the attack. The Czechs stated that it was too early for a liberation of the camp, but the Poles decided to coordinate it the next day due to the German plans of killing 280 prisoners before American arrival, which would most probably free the Jews. As 5 May began, the attack started and ended in a success. The number of freed women is disputed between 700 and 1,000, though it is agreed that 167 Polish and 280 Jewish women were freed. 200 SS members and 15 guards were imprisoned.

References

1945 in military history
1945 in Czechoslovakia
May 1945 events
Military history of Poland during World War II
Military history of Czechoslovakia during World War II
Czechoslovakia–Poland relations